Thohoyandou is a town in the Limpopo Province of South Africa. It is the administrative centre of Vhembe District Municipality and Thulamela Local Municipality. It is also known for being the former capital of the bantustan of Venda.

History

Thohoyandou became the capital of the former bantustan of Venda, while Dzanani is the traditional capital of Venda and the home of the VhaVenda kings. Thohoyandou name means "head of the elephant" in the Venda language, and was the name of one of the VhaVenda kings.

Thohoyandou was built at Tshiluvhi which was under Khosi vho Netshiluvhi. Construction started in 1977 with P East and P West residential area/location as R293 town, a shopping centre and Venda Government buildings. The Netshiluvhis were the first occupants of the area as far back as 1400 AD, i.e. after the collapse of Mapungubwe Kingdom. They were forcefully removed from this area between 1960 and 1970 by the apartheid government of the Venda Bantustan under khosi vho Mphephu Ramabulana. The name Tshiluvhi comes from the Venda word "luvha" which means to pay damages or respect. The former Venda president built his palace and his ministerial resident at Tshiluvhis chiefs kraal as they were already moved by the apartheid government. The following leaders and their subject under Netshiluvhi were forcefully removed from their areas. Some of the Netshiluvhi are known by different names: Malima, Khorommbi, Mathomu, Magidi, and Mudau. The name Tshiluvhi was totally stricken out and replaced by Thohoyandou as per the then government, and was left as a name of a primary school.

Thohoyandou was established and built at a large portion of the village of Tshiluvhi in the late 1970s. It was established by president Patrick Ramaano Mphephu who was the Prime Minister of the Venda Bantustan. Thohoyandou became the capital of Venda when Venda was declared a republic in 1979, and Thovhele ´Mphephu became the President of the Republic of Venda. Thohoyandou became the centre and economic hub of the Republic of Venda.

A stadium was built in Thohoyandou to celebrate the independence of Venda, and was known as the Venda Independence Stadium. The name was changed to Thohoyandou Stadium in 1994.

Today, Thohoyandou is one of the fastest-growing towns in Limpopo. It is also home to the University of Venda.

Thohoyandou is situated in the south of Vhembe district, north-west of Malamulele on the R524 main road between Louis Trichardt and the Kruger National Park. This is the lush agricultural centre of Vhembe, with banana plantations, subtropical fruit, tobacco and maize lands. Thohoyandou is surrounded by small rural townships such as Maungani, Ngovhela, Vondwe, Phiphidi, Muledane, Duthuni, Tshisahulu, Maungani, Shayandima, Makwarela, and Maniini.

Economy 

Thohoyandou is the main development node in Thulamela Local Municipality with a total of approximately 70,000 residents within the boundaries of the town. It is further surrounded by numerous rural settlements situated on the outskirts of the built-up area.

Thohoyandou's CBD was originally designed as a super mall with large walkways and water fountains, flowers and green areas. The parking lot was situated on the outskirts and people would walk to the shops. Shortage of vacant land within the CBD has slowed its growth and kept it from expanding further. The CBD has also suffered from a lack of maintenance over the past fifteen years. There is a big mall "Thavhani Mall", that has been built in Thohoyandou.

Other towns which are nearby Thohoyandou are Sibasa, 8 km; Dzanani, 45 km; Malamulele, 45 km; Makhado, 85 km; Musina, 139 km; and Polokwane, 188 km. Surrounding locations and villages include, Maniini, Muledane, Shayandima, Tswinga, Itsani, Manamani, Maungani, Tshisahulu and Duthuni.

University of Venda 

The University of Venda is a South African Comprehensive rural based university, located in Thohoyandou in Limpopo province. It was established in 1982 under the then Republic of Venda government.

The University of Venda has one main Campus in Thohoyandou. The campus houses all seven faculties of the institution namely The School of Agriculture, School of Education, School of Environmental Science, School of Health Sciences, School of Human and Social Sciences, School of Management Sciences, School of Mathematical and Natural Sciences and The Univen School of Law.

The campus also houses the Art Gallery, which has a display of carvings, paintings and clay pots made by both students and local community members. Furthermore, the campus has a full-time Sports Center that is used for indoor sports as well as other recreational activities such as drama and dance. The main campus houses nine of the eleven official residences, namely Bernard Ncube, Carousel, F3, F4, F5, Lost City Boys, Lost City Girls, Mango Groove, Riverside and Prefab.

Colleges 
 Thasululo FET College
 Vhembe TVET College

Primary and Secondary Schools 

 Maranzhe Primary School (Murangoni Primary School)
 Luphai Secondary School
 Azwifarwi Secondary School
 Muthamaro Secondary School
 Tshiluvhi Primary School
 Herman Technical High School
 Liivha Combined School
 Marude Secondary School
 Thohoyandou Secondary School
 Thohoyandou Technical High School
 Tshikevha Christian School
 Tshishonga Primary School
 Magidi Primary School
 Gindikindi Primary School
 Makwarela Primary School
 Miluwani Primary School
 Mbaleni Primary School
 Mmbara Primary School
 Maṋiini Primary School
 Mphaphuli Secondary School
 Tshilungoma Primary School
 Muratho Primary School
 Mvudi Primary School
 Mahwasane Primary School
 Thivhilaeli Secondary School
 Tshikonelo Primary School
 Khwevha Commercial School
 Tshivhulani Primary School
 Nthetsheleseni Secondary School
 Madadzhe Secondary School
 Fulufhelo Special School
 Manzere primary school
 Tshivhuyuni primary school 
 Shayandima Secondary School
 Tshivhase Secondary School
 Makumbane Primary School
 Khwevha Commercial High school
 Dimani Agricultural High school
 Thambatshira Secondary School
 Thengwe High School
 Shayandima School Of Tomorrow
 phiriphiri Secondary School
 Mbilwi Secondary School

References

 
Populated places in the Thulamela Local Municipality
Capitals of former nations